The Fiji Barbarians is a Fijian former rugby union representative team that played in the Pacific Rugby Cup from 2006 to 2010. The other Fijian team in the Cup was the Fiji Warriors. The players were drawn from the Fijian domestic competitions.

The Fiji Barbarians team qualified for the 2010 Pacific Cup final but lost the match to countrymen the Fiji Warriors by 17–26 at the National Stadium in Suva. The team had not featured in the finals for the previous four seasons.

Record

Honours
Pacific Rugby Cup
 Runners-up: 2010.

Season standings
Pacific Rugby Cup
{| class="wikitable" style="text-align:center;"
|- border=1 cellpadding=5 cellspacing=0
! style="width:20px;"|Year
! style="width:20px;"|Pos
! style="width:20px;"|Pld
! style="width:20px;"|W
! style="width:20px;"|D
! style="width:20px;"|L
! style="width:20px;"|F
! style="width:20px;"|A
! style="width:25px;"|+/-
! style="width:20px;"|BP
! style="width:20px;"|Pts
! style="width:50px;"|Final
! align=left|Notes 
|-  
|align=left|2010
|2nd
|5||4||0||1||145||116||+29||3||19
|17–26 ||align=left| Lost final to Fiji Warriors
|- 
|align=left|2009
|6th
|5||1||0||4||74||191||−117||1||5
| — ||align=left| Did not compete in finals
|-
|align=left|2008
|4th
|5||2||0||3||72||90||−18||2||10
| — ||align=left| Did not compete in finals
|-
|align=left|2007
|3rd
|5||2||0||3||97||108||−11||4||12
| — ||align=left| Did not compete in finals
|-
|align=left|2006
|3rd
|5||2||1||2||76||73||+3||2||12
| — ||align=left| Did not compete in finals
|}

Squads

2008 Pacific Rugby Cup Squad:

 * denotes players who were in the Fiji 2007 RWC squad.
 ** denotes players who have played for Fiji in a Test.
 *** denotes players who have played 7s for Fiji in the IRB Series.

Coaching team
Coach: Etuate Waqa
Manager: Isei Raiyawa
Assistant coach (Forwards): Josua Toakula
Assistant coach (Backs): Luke Rogoyawa

See also

Australian Barbarians
Brussels Barbarians
French Barbarians
New Zealand Barbarians
South African Barbarians

References

Barbarian F.C.
International rugby union teams
Defunct Fijian rugby union teams